The 2010 Copa Sevilla was a professional tennis tournament played on clay courts. It was the 13th edition of the tournament which was part of the 2010 ATP Challenger Tour. It took place in Sevilla, Spain between 6 and 11 September.

ATP entrants

Seeds

 Rankings are as of August 30, 2010.

Other entrants
The following players received wildcards into the singles main draw:
  Marc López
  Javier Martí
  Ismael Rodríguez-Ramos
  Javier Valenzuela-González

The following players received entry from the qualifying draw:
  Carlos Gómez-Herrera
  Gerard Granollers-Pujol
  Treat Conrad Huey
  Pablo Martín-Adalia

Champions

Singles

 Albert Ramos-Viñolas def.  Pere Riba, 6–3, 3–6, 7–5

Doubles

 Daniel Muñoz de la Nava /  Santiago Ventura def.  Nikola Ćirić /  Guillermo Olaso, 6–2, 7–5

References
Official website
ITF Search 

 
2010
2010 ATP Challenger Tour
2010 in Spanish tennis
September 2010 sports events in Europe